Universal Channel was a Greek television network, owned by Universal Networks International, a division of NBCUniversal. It debuted in Greece on May 5, 2008, exclusively on OTE TV, the pay-TV service of OTE, one of the major telecommunication groups in Southeastern Europe. Later, the channel broadcast in Cyprus via PrimeTel, Cablenet and CytaVision. The Channel hosted the branded block Sci Fi, the brand dedicated to science fiction, horror, fantasy and paranormal of NBCUniversal. Sci-Fi aired every Saturday from 9 PM to 1:10 AM and every Sunday starting from around 4 to 9 PM.

Universal Channel Greece broadcast TV series and movies produced by Universal Pictures, Warner Bros., 20th Century Fox and CBS. It has aired many series for first time on Greek TV, such as Parenthood, Nurse Jackie, Flashpoint and Haven, while the Sci Fi block aired among the others Eureka, Sanctuary and non fiction shows like Fact or Faked: Paranormal Files and Destination Truth.

Universal Channel (Greece) aired exclusive Universal Networks International series, for the first time on Greek TV, such as Rookie Blue and Fairly Legal. The network also showed many Hollywood blockbusters of various genre such as The Blues Brothers, Twelve Monkeys, Bean, Carlito's Way, Waterworld, Pitch Black, Meet Joe Black and Shakespeare in Love.  Universal Channel (Greece) was received very well by its subscribers.

May 31, 2012, NBCUniversal ceased providing Universal Channel to OTE TV and it was replaced by Village Cinema. On March 31, 2013, this channel ceased broadcasting in Cyprus and was replaced by Sundance TV.

Programmes
 30 Rock
 Boy Meets Girl
 Columbo
 Cops
 Covert Affairs
 Destination Truth
 Eureka
 Fact or Faked: Paranormal Files
 Fairly Legal
 Flashpoint
 Flipping Out
 Haven
 House M.D.
 Impact
 In Plain Sight
 Kath & Kim
 Law & Order
 Law & Order: LA
 Law & Order: UK
 Malcolm in the Middle
 Miami Social
 Million Dollar Listing
 Monk
 My Name Is Earl
 Nurse Jackie
 Parenthood
 Psych
 Rookie Blue
 Sanctuary
 Sea Patrol
 Shattered
 The Office
 The Philanthropist

See also
 Universal TV

Television channels and stations established in 2008
Greek-language television stations
Defunct television channels in Greece
NBCUniversal networks
Television channels and stations disestablished in 2013
2008 establishments in Greece
2012 disestablishments in Greece
2013 disestablishments in Cyprus